KISS 98.5 may refer to:

WKSE, a radio station in the Buffalo, NY market
WPIA, a radio station in the Peoria, IL market